Carlos Moyà was the defending champion and won in the final 3–6, 6–4, 7–6(7–5) against Paradorn Srichaphan.

Seeds

  Carlos Moyà (champion)
  Paradorn Srichaphan (final)
  Rainer Schüttler (first round)
  Jonas Björkman (second round)
  Kenneth Carlsen (second round)
  Yen-Hsun Lu (second round)
  Grégory Carraz (first round)
  Kevin Kim (second round)

Draw

Finals

Top half

Bottom half

External links
2005 Chennai Open Draw
2005 Chennai Open Qualifying Draw

Singles
Maharashtra Open